Shotgun Justice is the sixth studio album by Canadian speed/thrash metal band Razor. Released in 1990 on Fringe Product, it is the final album to feature Adam Carlo on bass, Rob Mills on drums and their first with vocalist Bob Reid. Music videos were made for "Shotgun Justice" and "American Luck".

Track listing

Notes
 Re-issued in 2010 as a 12" limited edition colored vinyl by High Roller Records in heavy cardboard with lyric sheet, limited to 750 copies. The cover art is more detailed than the original
 Re-issued in 2014 as a 12" limited edition colored vinyl by High Roller Records in 425gsm heavy cardboard cover and with lyric sheet, limited to 300 copies. Cover art same as above
 The 2015 digital release is dedicated to Mark “Hamilton Headcaver” Brzezicki. Cover art same as above
 Re-issued in 2016 as a 12" limited edition colored vinyl by High Roller Records, limited to 750 copies. Cover art same as above

Personnel 
Adam Carlo - Bass
Dave Carlo - Guitars
Rob Mills - Drums
Bob Reid - Vocals

Production
Steve Kubica - Photography
Brian Taylor - Producer
Alexander von Wieding - Artwork & Design (2009 Re-issue)
Joe Primeau - Engineering
Greg Johnstone - Cover art
Dana Marostega - Layout

References

Razor (band) albums
1990 albums